Savant syndrome is a rare condition in which someone with significant mental disabilities demonstrates certain abilities far in excess of average. The skills that savants excel at are generally related to memory. This may include rapid calculation, artistic ability, map making, or musical ability. Usually, only one exceptional skill is present.

Those with the condition generally have a neurodevelopmental disorder such as autism spectrum disorder or have a brain injury. About half of cases are associated with autism, and these individuals may be known as "autistic savants". While the condition usually becomes apparent in childhood, some cases develop later in life. It is not recognized as a mental disorder within the DSM-5.

Savant syndrome is estimated to affect around one in a million people. The condition affects more males than females, at a ratio of 6:1. The first medical account of the condition was in 1783. Among those with autism, 1 in 10 to 1 in 200 have savant syndrome to some degree. It is estimated that there are fewer than a hundred prodigious savants, with skills so extraordinary that they would be considered spectacular even for a non-impaired person, currently living.

Signs and symptoms

Savant skills are usually found in one or more of five major areas: art, memory, arithmetic, musical abilities, and spatial skills. The most common kinds of savants are calendrical savants, "human calendars" who can calculate the day of the week for any given date with speed and accuracy, or recall personal memories from any given date. Advanced memory is the key "superpower" in savant abilities.

Approximately half of savants are autistic; the other half often have some form of central nervous system injury or disease. It is estimated that up to 10% of those with autism have some form of savant abilities.

Calendrical savants
A  (or ) is someone who – despite having an intellectual disability – can name the day of the week of a date, or vice versa, on a limited range of decades or certain millennia. The rarity of human calendar calculators is possibly due to the lack of motivation to develop such skills among the general population, although mathematicians have developed formulas that allow them to obtain similar skills. Calendrical savants, on the other hand, may not be prone to invest in socially engaging skills.

Mechanism

Psychological
No widely accepted cognitive theory explains savants' combination of talent and deficit. It has been suggested that individuals with autism are biased towards detail-focused processing and that this cognitive style predisposes individuals either with or without autism to savant talents. Another hypothesis is that savants hyper-systemize, thereby giving an impression of talent. Hyper-systemizing is an extreme state in the empathizing–systemizing theory that classifies people based on their skills in empathizing with others versus systemizing facts about the external world. Also, the attention to detail of savants is a consequence of enhanced perception or sensory hypersensitivity in these unique individuals. It has also been hypothesized that some savants operate by directly accessing deep, unfiltered information that exists in all human brains that is not normally available to conscious awareness.

Neurological
In some cases, savant syndrome can be induced following severe head trauma to the left anterior temporal lobe. Savant syndrome has been artificially replicated using low-frequency transcranial magnetic stimulation to temporarily disable this area of the brain.

Epidemiology

There are no objectively definitive statistics about how many people have savant skills. The estimates range from "exceedingly rare" to one in ten people with autism having savant skills in varying degrees. A 2009 British study of 137 parents of autistic children found that 28% believe their children met the criteria for a savant skill, defined as a skill or power "at a level that would be unusual even for 'normal' people". As many as 50 cases of sudden or acquired savant syndrome have been reported.

Males with savant syndrome outnumber females by roughly 6:1 (in Finland), slightly higher than the sex ratio disparity for autism spectrum disorders of 4.3:1.

History
The term idiot savant (French for "learned idiot") was first used to describe the condition in 1887 by John Langdon Down, who is known for his description of Down syndrome. The term idiot savant was later described as a misnomer because not all reported cases fit the definition of idiot, originally used for a person with a very severe intellectual disability. The term autistic savant was also used as a description of the disorder. Like idiot savant, the term came to be considered a misnomer because only half of those who were diagnosed with savant syndrome were autistic. Upon realization of the need for accuracy of diagnosis and dignity towards the individual, the term savant syndrome became widely accepted terminology.

Society and culture

Notable cases 

 Daniel Tammet, British author and polyglot
 Derek Paravicini, British blind musical prodigy and pianist
 Henriett Seth F., Hungarian autistic writer and artist
 Kim Peek, American "megasavant"
 Leslie Lemke, American musician
 Rex Lewis-Clack, American pianist and musical savant
 Matt Savage, American musician
 Stephen Wiltshire, British architectural artist
 Temple Grandin, American professor of animal science
 David M. Nisson, American scientist
 Tom Wiggins, American blind pianist and composer
 Tommy McHugh, British artist and poet
 Kodi Lee, 2019 America's Got Talent winner (musician)

Acquired cases
 Alonzo Clemons, American acquired savant sculptor
 Anthony Cicoria, American acquired savant pianist and medical doctor
 Derek Amato, American composer and pianist, he has developed savant syndrome and synesthesia
 Patrick Fagerberg, American acquired savant artist, inventor and former lawyer.
 Orlando Serrell, American acquired savant
 Jason Padgett, American mathematician, acquired after being hit in the back of the head while at a bar

Fictional cases
 Raymond Babbitt, autistic savant in the 1988 film Rain Man (inspired by Kim Peek)
 Park Shi-on, autistic savant in the 2013 South Korean medical drama Good Doctor
 Shaun Murphy, autistic savant in the 2017 U.S. medical drama The Good Doctor
 Kazan, autistic savant in the 1997 film Cube
 Kazuo Kiriyama, main antagonist in the Japan 1999 novel Battle Royale
 Jeong Jae-hee, autistic savant in the 2021 South Korean psychological drama Mouse
 Patrick Obyedkov, acquired savant in a 2007 episode of the U.S. medical drama House.
 Woo Young-woo, autistic savant in the 2022 South Korean legal drama Extraordinary Attorney Woo.
 Mashiro Shiina, autistic savant in the 2012 anime series The Pet Girl of Sakurasou.

See also 
 Autistic art
 Child prodigy
 Creativity and mental illness
 Wise fool
 Idiot
 Mental calculator
 Hyperthymesia
 Ideasthesia
 Twice exceptional

References 

Giftedness
Syndromes
Wikipedia medicine articles ready to translate
 
Exceptional memory